Camp Flog Gnaw Carnival, formerly known as the OFWGKTA Carnival or Odd Future carnival, is an annual American music festival and carnival curated by Tyler, the Creator and has been held annually since its inception in the fall of 2012. The camp's name is an anagram of "Wolf Gang" and also spells "Golf Wang" in reverse. It features a variety of carnival games and rides (those of which include a massive Ferris Wheel), food vendors, and a myriad of notable artists. Prior to 2016, the festival had only been held for one day. It is always held on a weekend. There is no explicit date(s) for which Camp Flog Gnaw is held. However, past carnivals have been held at either the end of October or the middle of November (with the exception of the first festival, which was held on September 30, 2012). The festival was not held from 2020 to 2022, but will be held in 2023.

During 2019's Camp Flog Gnaw, a special guest was rumored to perform, and fans were discussing who it could be online months prior to the festival. Many believed it would be Frank Ocean, an old affiliate of Odd Future. The special guest turned out to be Drake, and many attendees at the festival were left disappointed. Some fans repeatedly booed Drake during his set at the festival, eventually forcing him to walk offstage early since the crowd was not happy. This upset Tyler, the Creator, and he expressed his disappointment at the booing on Twitter.

Lineups

References

External links

Hip hop music festivals in the United States
Music festivals in Los Angeles
Music festivals established in 2012
2012 establishments in California
Tyler, the Creator